Codice di Avviamento Postale (Postal Sending Code) is the Italian post code numeric system, consisting of five digits, such as 20121 Milan. Created in 1967, they are commonly known as CAP. The first two digits denote the administrative province (two provinces when a province has been split after 1967); the third digit shows if the town is the chief-town of the province (odd number, usually 1 or 9, e.g. 07100 Sassari) or not (even, usually 0 or 8, e.g. 10015 Ivrea); the last two digits the specific town or village or the delivery post office (only in new provinces created after 1992). In main cities like Rome, Milan, Naples, Venice the last digits designate the urban postal district (usually 00 or 70 in minor provincial chief-towns). San Marino and the Vatican City are integrated into the Italian postcode system.

See also
List of postal codes in Italy

External links
The Italian ZIP Code - nonsoloCAP.it

Italy
Postal system of Italy